Charles Preston Cruthers (September 8, 1890 – December 27, 1976) was a second baseman in Major League Baseball who played from  through  for the Philadelphia Athletics. He was born in Marshallton, Delaware.

Cruthers played briefly for the Athletics in part of two seasons. He was a member of two American League champion teams, including the 1913 World Champion, though he did not play in the Series. As a backup for regular Eddie Collins, he posted a .222 batting average in seven games (6-for-27), including one double and one triple while scoring a run.

In six Minor league seasons (1913–1918), Cruthers was a .268 hitter with six home runs in 648 games. He also managed the Kenosha Comets of the All-American Girls Professional Baseball League during the  season.

Cruthers was a longtime resident of Kenosha, Wisconsin, where he died at the age of 86.

Sources

Major League Baseball second basemen
Philadelphia Athletics players
Raleigh Capitals players
Reading Pretzels players
Memphis Chickasaws players
All-American Girls Professional Baseball League managers
Baseball players from Delaware
Sportspeople from Kenosha, Wisconsin
1890 births
1976 deaths
Sportspeople from the Chicago metropolitan area
Baseball players from Wisconsin
Burials in Wisconsin